Syed Amanullah  known by his professional name Syed Aman Bachchan or Bachchan is an Indian film producer in the Kannada film industry. Edegarike, a film produced by him and directed by Sumana Kittur, was the only Indian film selected for screening in Mumbai Women's International Film Festival, 2013.

Selected filmography
 Kiragoorina Gayyaligalu (2016)
 Edegarike (2012)
 Thamassu (2010)
 Kallara Santhe (2009)
 Aa Dinagalu (2007)

Awards

Edegarike

Thamassu

Aa Dinagalu

See also

List of people from Karnataka
Cinema of Karnataka
List of film producers
Cinema of India

References

Citations

External links

Kannada film producers
Living people
Film producers from Karnataka
Year of birth missing (living people)